Rivar may refer to:
Rivar, England
Rivar, Iran